The Kriegsmarine operated at least two requisitioned merchant ships named Sylt during the Second World War.

, a tanker.
, a coaster.

Both ships were seized in May 1945 at Trondheim, Norway. They became Empire Tegidad and Empire Continent respectively.

Sylt